Jacques Goldberg (16 January 1861 – 26 September 1934) was a German musician, actor and theatre director.

Life 
Goldberg was born in  Braunschweig. He had three siblings: Albert (8 June 1847 in Braunschweig - 1 November 1906 in Leipzig), opera director and singer and conductor, Golde Georgine (28 May 1850) and Joseph Julius (18 April 1856). The theatre director and screenwriter Heinz Goldberg was his nephew.

Goldberg received musical training as a violinist as a child and came to the US at the age of sixteen, playing in the orchestra of Cincinnati and other major cities in North America. Returning from there in 1880, he worked as an actor and later as a director at German-speaking theatres, such as the Hoftheater Coburg-Gotha and the Landestheater Prag. Around 1895, Goldberg was apparently a director at the Estates Theatre in Prague. He also worked at the municipal theatres in Magdeburg, Bremen, Essen, Hamburg, Krefeld and Mainz. In Prague, he directed the stage premiere of Richard Wagner's The Fairies. In 1896, Goldberg was appointed director at the Stadttheater in Szczecin. After the end of his engagement there in 1900, Goldberg first performed Tristan und Isolde at the St. Georges Hall Theatre in London, after which he made a guest appearance at the Theater des Westens in Berlin. Goldberg's other engagements subsequently included stage director at the Metropolitan Opera in 1905/1906, Düsseldorf in 1906, artistic director of the municipal theatre in Colmar in 1907. His comedy Her Ideal was repeatedly performed.

Goldberg died in Berlin at the age of 73.

Work 
 with Wild-Queisner: Ihr Ideal. Lustspiel.

Awards 
 Königlich Schwedischer Order of Vasa I. Class.

References

Further reading 
 Herrmann A. L. Degener: .  H.A. Ludwig Degener publisher, IVth edition, Leipzig 1909, .
 Herrmann A. L. Degener: Wer ist's 1935. Xth edition. Verlag Hermann Degener, Berlin 1935, pp. 513 f.
 Rudolf Vierhaus (ed.): Deutsche Biographische Enzyklopädie (DBE). 2nd edition, vol.4 Görres–Hittorp, K. G. Saur Verlag, Munich 2006, .
 Ludwig Eisenberg: Jacques Goldberg. In: Großes biographisches Lexikon der deutschen Bühne im XIX. Jahrhundert. Paul List, Leipzig 1903,  (daten.digitale-sammlungen.de).

German film actors
Knights First Class of the Order of Vasa
German theatre directors
German opera directors
German classical violinists
1861 births
1934 deaths
People from Braunschweig